The United Church of Christ, Congregational is a historic Congregational church in Burlington, Massachusetts.  Built in 1732, it is one of the oldest religious structures in Massachusetts, and one of a small number of pre-19th century church buildings.  It was redesigned in 1846 to bring it into the then-popular Greek Revival style, extending it in length and adding a somewhat Gothic-looking steeple.  In 1888, when the Colonial Revival was becoming popular, a number of these changes were in effect reversed, restoring a more Colonial-style steeple.

When built, the area that is now Burlington was still part of Woburn, and this church was the second, built to serve what is now Burlington.  It was the site in 1775 of some critical meetings, both military and political, of Patriots in the American Revolutionary War.  The church served as a parish of Massachusetts' state funded church until the churches were disaffiliated from the state government in the early nineteenth century. 

In 1909, Martha E. Sewall Curtis published, Ye olde meeting house : addresses and verses relating to the meeting house, Burlington, Middlesex County, Massachusetts, built 1732, and other historical addresses.

The meeting house was added to the National Register of Historic Places in 1990. The congregation is currently affiliated with the United Church of Christ.

See also
National Register of Historic Places listings in Middlesex County, Massachusetts

References

External links
UCC Burlington Church website

United Church of Christ churches in Massachusetts
Burlington, Massachusetts
Churches on the National Register of Historic Places in Massachusetts
Churches in Middlesex County, Massachusetts
National Register of Historic Places in Middlesex County, Massachusetts